James Grimes (born 26 March 1968) is a Canadian former international soccer player who played as a striker.

He began playing soccer Malmesbury School in Wiltshire, England when he was 9. He moved from Wiltshire to Bramalea, Ontario, Canada when he was 10, with his first youth club in Canada being Chinguacousy FC. He played for the Hamilton Steelers and Toronto Blizzard of the Canadian Soccer League in 1990.

References

1968 births
Living people
Canadian soccer players
Canada men's international soccer players
North York Rockets players
Canadian Soccer League (1987–1992) players
Clemson Tigers men's soccer players
Association football forwards
Canadian expatriate soccer players
Canadian expatriate sportspeople in the United States
Expatriate soccer players in the United States
Hamilton Steelers (1981–1992) players
20th-century Canadian people